Death playing chess (in Swedish: Döden spelar schack) is a monumental painting in Täby Church located just outside Stockholm, Sweden. It was painted around 1480–1490, by the Swedish medieval painter Albertus Pictor.

The painting depicts a man and a skeleton at a chessboard. Above them is a ribbon, now faded, which once read "Jak spelar tik matt", "I checkmate thee".

A copy of the mural is stored in the collections of the Swedish Museum of History in Stockholm.

Analysis
The artist was born with the name Albrecht, and was sometimes called Immenhusen, after the village Immenhusen in Hesse, Germany. It is assumed that Albertus was educated in southern Germany.

He is one of the most significant medieval Swedish artists. His works represent a unique combination of quality and quantity. He painted 36 churches in Mälardalen and Norrbotten. He stands out as the most active artist in the Swedish church painting in the second half of the 15th century. He differs from other artists of the same period with his bright expression. His painting has unusual breadth and diversity in his technical performance. This mural represents how a knight plays chess with death and skillfully depicts figures with precise anatomical proportions, combining them with clothes and weapons, with a relatively realistic vision.

The mural inspired Ingmar Bergman to create the film The Seventh Seal in 1957.

References 

1480 paintings
15th century in chess
Church frescos in Sweden
Death in art
Medieval painters
Murals
Religious art
Stockholm County
Swedish paintings
Chess paintings